Hintham is a village west of Rosmalen in the 's-Hertogenbosch municipality of North Brabant province. Hintham is known for the Interchange Hintham, an interchange in the A2 motorway, the highway from Amsterdam to Maastricht.

Populated places in North Brabant
's-Hertogenbosch